S. P. Ayyaswamy Mudaliar was a freedom fighter from the Indian state of Tamil Nadu. His house Gandhi Peak in Royapettah, Chennai  hosted many INC meetings. Even today it is preserved by his family members. Netaji Subashchandra Bose stayed in his house on two occasions. Ayyaswami Mudaliar was a civil engineer by profession. The Chief Justice of Manipur High Court R Sudhakar is his great-grandson.

References

Indian independence activists from Tamil Nadu
Year of birth missing
Year of death missing